The Women's Downhill competition of the Lillehammer 1994 Olympics was held at Kvitfjell on Saturday, 19 February.

The defending world champion was Kate Pace Lindsay of Canada, while Germany's Katja Seizinger was the defending World Cup downhill champion and led the current season.

Seizinger won the gold medal, Picabo Street of the United States took the silver, and Isolde Kostner of Italy was the bronze medalist.

Results
The race was started at 11:00 local time, (UTC +1).

References 

Women's downhill
Alp
Olymp